Frånö SK is a Swedish football club based in Kramfors currently playing in the Division 4 Ångermanland of the Swedish football league system. The club was formed on 4 January 1932.

Football clubs in Västernorrland County
Association football clubs established in 1932
1932 establishments in Sweden